Doctor or The Doctor may refer to:

Personal titles 

 Doctor (title), the holder of an accredited academic degree.
 A medical practitioner, including:
 Audiologist
 Dentist
 Optometrist
 Physician
 Surgeon
 Veterinary physician
 Other roles
 Doctor of the Church, a title given to those with great contribution to Christian theology or doctrine.
 Doctor of Nursing Practice
 Doctor of Pharmacy
 Doctor of Philosophy

People
 The Doctor (nickname), people with nickname or stage name of "Doctor" or "The Doctor".
 Doctor Willard Bliss (1825–1889), American physician.
 Doctor Greenwood (1860–1951), English footballer.
 Sean Doctor (born 1966), American football player.
 List of physicians

Arts, entertainment, and media

Characters
 Doctor, a character in 1998 American comedy movie My Giant.
 Doctor (Black Cat)
 Doctor (Hellsing)
 The Doctor (Cave Story), also known as Fuyuhiko Date.
 The Doctor (Doctor Who)
 The Doctor (Star Trek: Voyager)
 Doctor Scalpel or "The Doctor", a character in Transformers: Revenge of the Fallen.
 The Doctor or Cobra Commander, a character from G.I. Joe: A Real American Hero.
 The Doctor, an antagonist in Little Nightmares II.
 List of fictional doctors

Films
 Doctor (film series), popular British hospital comedy films of the 1950s–1960s.
 Doctor (1963 film), Indian Malayalam-language film by M. S. Mani.
 Doctor (2013 film), South Korean film.
 Doctor (2021 film), Indian Tamil-language film by Nelson Dillipkumar.
 The Doctor (1991 film), William Hurt plays a doctor whose own illness transforms his later approach to patients.
 The Doctor (2013 film), a TV film about basketball player Julius Erving.

Music
 Doctor (band)

Albums
 The Doctor (Beenie Man album)
 The Doctor (Cheap Trick album)
 The Doctor (Thomas Nöla et son Orchestre album)
 Doctor (soundtrack), 2021 soundtrack album to the 2021 Tamil-language film Doctor.

Songs
 "Doctor", a song by Cute Is What We Aim For.
 "Doctor" (Loïc Nottet song), a single by Loïc Nottet.
 "The Doctor" (Mary Wells song)
 "The Doctor" (The Doobie Brothers song)
 "Doctor", a 2018 song by Chanmina.
 "Doctor! Doctor!", a single by the Thompson Twins.

Television

Series
 Doctors (2000 TV series), a British soap opera that began airing on BBC One in 2000.
 The Doctor (1952 TV series), an American anthology series that ran on NBC from 1952 to 1953.
 The Doctors (1963 TV series), an American soap opera that aired on NBC from 1963 to 1982.
 The Doctors (1969 TV series), a British medical drama that aired on BBC from 1969 to 1971.
 The Doctors (2016 TV series), a South Korean drama.
 The Doctors (talk show)

Episodes
 "The Doctor" (Once Upon a Time), a television episode.
 "Doctor, Doctor", an episode of The Real Ghostbusters.
 "The Doctor" (Bluey), an episode of the first season of the animated TV series Bluey.

Other arts, entertainment, and media
 Doctors (novel), by Erich Segal.
 The Doctor (painting), a painting by Luke Fildes.
 The Doctor (play), a play by Robert Icke.

Other uses 
 Doctor (cocktail), a family of mixed alcoholic drinks.
 DOCTOR, a script for Joe Weizenbaum's program ELIZA, simulating a Rogerian psychotherapist.
 Fremantle Doctor or the Doctor, a Western Australian afternoon sea breeze.
 Doctores metro station, in Mexico City, Mexico.

See also 

 
 
 
 
Daktari
 DR (disambiguation)
 Doc (disambiguation)
 Docter (disambiguation)
 Doctor Doctor (disambiguation)
 Doctor Who (disambiguation)
 Doktor (disambiguation)
 The Doctors (disambiguation)